Marlice Elretha Jansen van Vuuren (born 14 May 1976 as Marlice Elrethra van der Merwe) is a Namibian conservationist. Together with her husband she runs the N/a’an ku sê Wildlife Sanctuary in central Namibia.

Van Vuuren has been working with animals in film productions since the age of 13 and has worked on a number of well known movies with various celebrities including Angelina Jolie. Her life is covered in the 2008 documentary "Marlice – A Vision for Africa" by Philip Selkirk. Marlice van Vuuren and her three legged cheetah Lucky featured in an advert for a Volkswagen Golf, shown on South African TV in May 2009.

Family 
Marlice van Vuuren grew up on her parents' farm in Namibia where for more than 30 years injured or orphaned animals have found refuge. She also grew up closely with the San people and is one of only a handful of white people who can speak one of their languages. She married Dr. Rudie van Vuuren in December 2000 with whom she has two children.

See also
 Tippi Degré
 Sabine Kuegler

References

External links
Naankuse website Wildlife Sanctuary in Namibia run by Marlice and Rudie van Vuuren

1976 births
Living people
Namibian conservationists
Nature conservation in Namibia
White Namibian people